Stejneger's scoter (Melanitta stejnegeri), also known as the Siberian scoter, is a large sea duck. The genus name is derived from Ancient Greek melas "black" and netta "duck".

Taxonomy
Stejneger's scoter was described by the American ornithologist Robert Ridgway in 1887 and given the binomial name Oidemia stejnegeri. The specific name was chosen to honour the Norwegian born ornithologist Leonhard Stejneger.

It was formerly considered to be conspecific with the white-winged scoter. It was suggested to be a full species, according to a new study.

Description
There are a number of differing characteristics of Stejneger's scoter and the white-winged scoter. Males of the white-winged scoter have browner flanks, dark yellow coloration of most of the bill and a less tall bill knob, approaching the velvet scoter. The male Stejneger's scoter has a very tall knob at the base of its mostly orange-yellow bill. the male of both species are very similar and best distinguished by head shape; White-winged scoters tend to have "two-stepped" profile between the bill and the head, compared to the long "Roman nose" profile of Stejneger's scoter similar to that of a Common eider. Additionally, the feathering along the base of the upper mandible forms a right angle on the White-winged scoter, compared to the acute angle on the Stejneger's Scoter.

Distribution
Stejneger's scoter breeds over the far north of Asia east of the Yenisey Basin. It winters further south in temperate zones, in Asia as far south as China. It forms large flocks on suitable coastal waters. These are tightly packed, and the birds tend to take off together. 

Though previously considered rare in North America, Stejneger's scoter may be a regular visitor and possible breeder in Western Alaska, with sightings in Nome, Saint Paul Island and Gambell. A Stejneger's Scoter was seen in Helena Valley, Montana between April to May 2015, the only confirmed North American occurrence of the species south of Alaska. A scoter seen in Monterey Bay, California on January 15, 2014 appeared to have characteristics consistent with Stejneger's scoter but the record was not accepted by the committee due to the poor quality of images.

Behaviour and ecology

Feeding
In freshwater, this species primarily feeds on crustaceans and insects; while in saltwater areas, it feeds on molluscs and crustaceans.

References

External links

 
 

Stejneger's scoter
Birds of North Asia
Stejneger's scoter
Stejneger's scoter